The 1995–96 season was the 116th season of competitive football by Rangers.

Overview
Rangers played a total of 53 competitive matches during the 1995–96 season. The team finished first in the Scottish Premier Division and won its eighth consecutive league title.

In the cup competitions, the team won the Scottish Cup, beating Heart of Midlothian 5–1.  Rangers were knocked out the Scottish League Cup by Aberdeen at the semi final stage, losing 2–1.

The side reached the group stages of the UEFA Champions League this season and were drawn into a group with Juventus, Borussia Dortmund and Romanian side Steaua Bucharest. After six matches, three draws and three defeats, Rangers were bottom of the table and exited the competition.

Aided by the sale of Duncan Ferguson the previous season, between July and February manager Walter Smith spent nearly £12million on rebuilding his squad by signing the likes of Peter van Vossen, Paul Gascoigne (a then Scottish record signing at £4.3million), Stephen Wright and Gordan Petric.  Basile Boli and Oleg Salenko left the club.

Gascoigne was voted player of the year having scored a total of 19 goals in all competitions.

November saw the departure of Mark Hateley as he returned to England in a £1.5million move to Queen's Park Rangers – the largest fee paid for a 34-year-old at this time. Hateley had lost his place in the first team to Gordon Durie who partnered Ally McCoist after two seasons mostly spent on the sidelines due to injuries.

Transfers

In

Out

Expendure:  £11,600,000
Income:  £3,725,000
Total loss/gain:  £7,850,000

Results
All results are written with Rangers' score first.

Scottish Premier Division

UEFA Champions League

League Cup

Scottish Cup

Appearances

League table

See also
Nine in a row

References 

Rangers F.C. seasons
Rangers
Scottish football championship-winning seasons